Emblemaria caycedoi, the Colombian blenny, is a species of chaenopsid blenny found around Venezuela and Isla de Providencia, Colombia, in the western central Atlantic Ocean. The specific name honours the young marine biologist Enrique Caycedo Lara, who died in 1978.

References
 Acero P., A. 1984 A new species of Emblemaria (Pisces: Clinidae: Chaenopsinae) from the southwestern Caribbean with comments on two other species of the genus. Bulletin of Marine Science v. 35 (no. 2): 187–194.

caycedoi
Fish described in 1984